The 2019–20 Nebraska Cornhuskers men's basketball team represented the University of Nebraska in the 2019–20 NCAA Division I men's basketball season. The Cornhuskers were led by first-year coach head coach Fred Hoiberg and play their home games at Pinnacle Bank Arena in Lincoln, Nebraska as members of the Big Ten Conference. They finished the season 7–25, 2–18 in Big Ten play to finish in last place. They lost to Indiana in the first round of the Big Ten tournament which was subsequently canceled due to the COVID-19 pandemic.

In the final game of the season against Indiana, Fred Hoiberg appeared ill during the game, left the game in the second half, and was taken to the hospital. He was tested for COVID-19 due to the ongoing pandemic, but he was diagnosed with influenza. As a result of Hoiberg's sickness, the team was quarantined in the locker room following the Indiana game for a short period of time.

Previous season
The Cornhuskers finished the 2017–18 season 19–17, 6–14 in Big Ten play to finish second-to-last. As the No. 13 seed in the Big Ten tournament, they made a run but lost in the quarterfinals to Wisconsin. Despite winning 13 Big Ten games, the Cornhuskers received a bid to the National Invitation Tournament. They won in the first round of the NIT to Mississippi State but lost in the second round to TCU.

Following the season, head coach Tim Miles was fired, having lead the team after seven seasons. Four days later, the school hired former Chicago Bulls' head coach Fred Hoiberg as the next head coach of the program.

Offseason
Due to a change in coaching staff, Nebraska experienced a near-complete overhaul of its roster, retaining only two players from the previous season (only one of which had seen any playing time for Nebraska). The rebuilt team took an exhibition trip to Italy; a documentary on the trip was filmed by the Big Ten Network.

Departures

Incoming transfers

Other arrivals
Noah Vedral and Brant Banks, two members of the Nebraska Cornhuskers football team joined the team as emergency back-ups prior to the 2020 Big Ten Conference men's basketball tournament due to depth issues.

Recruiting classes

2019 recruiting class

Roster

Schedule and results

|-
!colspan=9 style=|Foreign exhibition tour

|-
!colspan=9 style=|Exhibition

|-
!colspan=9 style=|Regular season

|-
!colspan=9 style=|Big Ten tournament

Schedule source:

References

Nebraska Cornhuskers men's basketball seasons
Nebraska
Nebraska
Nebraska